Ceanothus velutinus, with the common names snowbrush ceanothus, red root, and tobacco brush, is a species of shrub in the family Rhamnaceae. It is native to western North America from British Columbia to California to Colorado, where it grows in several habitat types including coniferous forest, chaparral, and various types of woodland.

Description

Ceanothus velutinus grows up to 4 meters tall but generally remains under three, and forms colonies of individuals which tangle together to form nearly impenetrable thickets. The aromatic evergreen leaves are alternately arranged, each up to 8 centimeters long. The leaves are oval in shape with minute glandular teeth along the edges, and shiny green and hairless on the top surface.

The plentiful inflorescences are long clusters of white flowers. The fruit is a three-lobed capsule a few millimeters long which snaps open explosively to expel the three seeds onto the soil, where they may remain in a buried seed bank for well over 200 years before sprouting. The seed is coated in a very hard outer layer that must be scarified, generally by wildfire, before it can germinate. Like most other ceanothus, this species fixes nitrogen via actinomycetes in its root nodules.

Uses
Deer and elk browse the plant during winter.

Some Plateau Indian tribes drank a boil of this plant to induce sweating as a treatment for colds, fevers, and influenza. Leaves were also used when rinsing to help prevent dandruff.

Ceanothus velutinus was known as "red root" by many Native American tribes due to the color of the inner root bark, and was used as a medicine for treating lymphatic disorders, ovarian cysts, fibroid tumors, and tonsillitis.  Clinical studies of the alkaloid compounds in C. velutinus has verified its effectiveness in treating high blood pressure and lymphatic blockages.

References

External links

Jepson Manual Treatment - Ceanothus velutinus
USDA Plants Profile: Ceanothus velutinus
Ceanothus velutinus - Photo gallery

velutinus
Flora of California
Flora of the Northwestern United States
Flora of British Columbia
Flora of Nevada
Flora of Utah
Flora of the Cascade Range
Flora of the Klamath Mountains
Flora of the Rocky Mountains
Flora of the Sierra Nevada (United States)
Natural history of the California chaparral and woodlands
Natural history of the California Coast Ranges
Natural history of the San Francisco Bay Area
Plants used in traditional Native American medicine
Flora without expected TNC conservation status